The Aryaloka Buddhist Center is a Buddhist organization in Newmarket, New Hampshire, affiliated with the Triratna Buddhist Community. It currently holds various activities for the Buddhist community, including yoga and meditation retreats.

History
The center was founded in 1985 as an establishment that would provide ideal conditions for practicing Buddhism. It is currently situated on thirteen acres of secluded land.

The center distributes the irregularly published magazine Vajra Bell.

Features

Facilities
The center consists of two buildings: the main building, and a smaller building known as the "akashaloka", which serve as accommodations for guests and retreat participants. Some of amenities are included below:

Main building
Large, multi-purpose room
Large meditation hall
Large lounge/dining area
Kitchen
Bedrooms
Buddhist reference library
Buddhaworks bookstore

Akashaloka
Small meditation hall
Small lounge/dining area
Kitchen
Bedrooms

Fourteen acres of woodland with walking trails

Stupa
In March 2009, three order members, Bodhilocana, Viriyagita, and Kiranada, led a ceremony in remembrance of one of Sangharakshita's teachers, Dhardo Rimpoche. Bodhilocana incited the community to build a stupa to hold Rimpoche's remains.

In the summer of 2014, the Dhardo Rimpoche Stupa was established on the center grounds. It is one among several stupas throughout the world among which Rinpoche's remains have been spread, the others being Sudarshanaloka Retreat Centre near Thames, New Zealand, Padmaloka Buddhist Retreat Centre near Norwich, England, Guhyaloka Retreat Centre near Alicante, Spain, Tiratanaloka Retreat Centre in Wales, and Vimaladhatu Retreat Centre in the Sauerland, Germany.

See also
 Triratna Buddhist Community
 Dharma center

External links
Aryaloka Buddhist Center homepage

References

1985 establishments in New Hampshire
Buddhist organizations based in the United States
Buddhism in New Hampshire
Religious organizations established in 1985
Spiritual retreats
Asian-American culture in New Hampshire